Migadopini is a tribe of ground beetles in the family Carabidae. There are about 16 genera and more than 40 described species in Migadopini.

Genera
These 16 genera belong to the tribe Migadopini:

 Antarctonomus Chaudoir, 1861  (South America)
 Aquilex Moret, 1989  (Ecuador)
 Calathosoma Jeannel, 1938  (New Zealand)
 Calyptogonia Sloane, 1920  (Australia)
 Decogmus Sloane, 1915  (Australia)
 Dendromigadops Baehr, 2013  (Australia)
 Lissopterus G.R.Waterhouse, 1843  (South America)
 Loxomerus Chaudoir, 1842  (New Zealand)
 Migadopidius Jeannel, 1938  (Chile)
 Migadops G.R.Waterhouse, 1842  (South America)
 Monolobus Solier, 1849  (Argentina and Chile)
 Nebriosoma Laporte, 1867  (Australia)
 Pseudomigadops Jeannel, 1938  (Argentina, Chile, Falkland Islands)
 Rhytidognathus Chaudoir, 1861  (Argentina, Uruguay)
 Stichonotus Sloane, 1910  (Australia)
 Taenarthrus Broun, 1914  (New Zealand)

References

Migadopinae